Crossroads is the second studio album by American singer-songwriter Tracy Chapman, released in 1989. Chapman was also a producer on this album, the first time she had taken on such a role. The song "Freedom Now" is dedicated to Nelson Mandela.

Track listing
All songs written by Tracy Chapman.

"Crossroads" – 4:11
"Bridges" – 5:24
"Freedom Now" – 4:02
"Material World" – 3:02
"Be Careful of My Heart" – 4:39
"Subcity" – 5:09
"Born to Fight" – 2:46
"A Hundred Years" – 4:20
"This Time" – 3:43
"All That You Have Is Your Soul" – 5:16

Personnel

Musicians
Tracy Chapman – acoustic guitar, harmonica (tracks 6, 10), electric guitar (tracks 3, 8), vocals, background vocals (track 3), 12 string guitar (tracks 6, 9), stagecoach guitar (track 10)
Charlie Bisharat – viola (track 6), electric violin (track 6), violin pizzicato (track 1)
Peggie Blu – background vocals (track 3)
Marc Cohn – piano (track 2)
Paulinho da Costa – tambourine (track 3), conga (track 8)
Carolyn Dennis – background vocals (track 3)
Denny Fongheiser – drums (tracks 1, 3, 4, 6, 7, 8)
Bobbye Hall – percussion (tracks 1, 4, 5), conga (tracks 3, 6), tambourine (track 7)
Jack Holder – banjo (track 3), piano (tracks 2, 7), acoustic stagecoach guitar (track 9), organ (track 9)
Larry Klein – bass guitar (tracks 1, 2, 3, 4, 5, 6, 8, 9)
Danny Kortchmar – electric guitar (track 8)
Russ Kunkel – drums (tracks 2, 6, 9)
Jim Lacefield – cello (track 10)
Tim Landers – bass guitar (tracks 3, 7)
Steve Lindley – electric piano (track 8)
Bob Marlette – keyboards (tracks 1, 2)
Frank Marocco – accordion (track 1)
Sheila Minard – background vocals (track 3)
Scarlet Rivera – violin (track 9)
Roz Seay – background vocals (track 3)
G.E. Smith – acoustic picking guitar (track 1), mandolin (track 5), electric guitar (track 4)
William D. "Smitty" Smith – organ (tracks 4, 6, 8)
John X. Volaitis – piano (track 9)
Elesecia Wright – background vocals (track 3)
Snooky Young – trumpet (track 7)
Neil Young – acoustic guitar (track 10), piano (track 10)

Production
Producers: Tracy Chapman, David Kershenbaum
Kevin W. Smith – engineer, mixing
Herb Ritts – cover photography

Charts

Weekly charts

Year-end charts

Singles

Certifications and sales

Awards
32nd Annual Grammy Awards

References

Tracy Chapman albums
1989 albums
Elektra Records albums
Albums produced by David Kershenbaum